Chaetopeltidales are an order of green algae in the class Chlorophyceae.

References

External links

 
Chlorophyta orders